The Gatehouse at Bonds Mill at Stonehouse, Gloucestershire, England, was constructed during World War II as a defensive pillbox as part of the Stop Line Green. It is a rare example of a two-storey pillbox with a rooftop gun emplacement and is a Grade II listed building. It is now used as a visitor centre run by the Cotswold Canals Trust.

It was built in 1940, as one of sixteen pillboxes alongside the Stroudwater Navigation, a canal that links Stroud to the Severn Estuary. It has an octagonal floorplan based on the Type 24 pillbox, the ground floor being constructed of reinforced concrete and the upper storey is red brick. It is situated on the north side of the canal, across from the former Bond's Mill, which was being used during the war by Sperry as a dispersal factory to manufacture gyroscopic compasses. After the war it was adapted for use as a gatehouse for the mill and later to include hydraulic controls for the bridge that crosses the canal. 

The historic swing bridge had survived the closure of the navigation in 1954, but had been widened and was no longer operable - it was in a very poor structural condition by the early 1990s. In 1994 the original bridge was replaced with the world's first composite plastic lift bridge for vehicular traffic, with the weight savings enabling reuse of the original abutments and no requirement for a counterweight.

The composite lift bridge has not been in regular operation while awaiting restoration of the rest of the canal, and has now deteriorated mechanically and structurally to the point where replacement is likely to be required as part of Phase 1B "The Missing Mile" reconnection to the national waterway network by 2025, likely with a conventional steel/counterweight design similar to that fitted at Lodgemore.

References

External links
Bond’s Mill Gatehouse — Visitor Centre

Stroud District
Fortifications in England
Grade II listed buildings in Gloucestershire